Kapowsin  is a census-designated place located approximately 25 miles (38 kilometers) southeast of Tacoma in Pierce County, Washington, United States. The 2020 Census placed the population at 249.

Kapowsin, originally Kapousen Precint, was named for its shallow lake.  The ancient glacial drainage channel provides a nearly level connection between the
Puyallup and Nisqually Rivers, and formed a natural travel route at the base of the Cascade foothills. Chief Kapowsin was a fictional leader with an iron fist who lived on the lake's shores, a folklore told by the Nisqually tribe that lived in the nearby village of bacálabc (or bišál; southwest of Eatonville) prior to the area being settled in 1888.  

Kapowsin was founded in 1901 when the Kapowsin Lumber Company built a sawmill at the community's present site. Located on the north end of Lake Kapowsin, the community was a thriving lumber town in the early part of the 20th century, with a high school, shops, and trades, and a population of about 10,000. After a decline in the timber industry, the town diminished in size into a neighborhood center, with a store, tavern, post office (US ZIP code 98344), fire station and grange hall. Kapowsin High School was abandoned in 1949 after being damaged in an earthquake. The 2010 Census placed the population at 333.

Kapowsin is located partially in the Bethel School District and partially in the Eatonville School District, and Kapowsin Elementary School is located nearby.  Secondary students attend Frontier Junior High and Graham-Kapowsin High School, which opened in 2005.  Tacoma Rail's freight line to Morton, Washington, runs through the town.

References

External links 
 

Census-designated places in Washington (state)
Census-designated places in Pierce County, Washington